Arroyo High School is located in San Lorenzo, California, and is part of the San Lorenzo Unified School District. Serving as one of two public high schools for San Lorenzo and parts of San Leandro, its sister high school and cross-town rival is San Lorenzo High School.

Small Learning Communities
The school includes four academies in partnership with the California Partnership Academies program.
Academy of Health and Medicine (An academy designed for students whom want to go into the health field)
Future Leaders for Social Change Academy (Futures academy teaches students to become critical thinkers and to become a leader)
Tech-Links Academy (Tech Links offers a rigorous, relevant, business and technology curriculum that prepares students for post-high school college and career opportunities)
Trend Academy (The TREND Academy provides students with the opportunity to step into the role of an engineer and or Industrial Designer, adopt a problem-solving mindset, engage in the engineering design process, and climatically make the leap from visionaries to doers)
These four CPAs are also called Small Learning Communities (SLCs).

Demographics
In the 2018-2019 school year, there were 1,819 students. 47% (859) are Latino, 31% (558) are Asian, 11% (195) are White, 7% (127) are African-American, 3% (48) are two or more races, 1% (25) are Pacific Islander, and less than 1% (7) are American Indian or Alaskan Native.

See also
Alameda County High Schools
San Lorenzo Unified School District

References

External links
 Arroyo High School Homepage

High schools in Alameda County, California
Public high schools in California
Educational institutions established in 1955
1955 establishments in California